The Ministry of Defence, abbreviated MINDEF, KEMENTAH, is a ministry of the Government of Malaysia that is responsible for defence, national security, army, navy, hydrography, air force, armed forces, intelligence services, counterintelligence, military intelligence, national service, and veterans affairs.

The Minister of Defence administers his functions through the Ministry of Defence and a range of other government agencies.

Its headquarters is in Kuala Lumpur.

History 
Ministry of Defence was established on 31 August 1957 and officially began operations in a building located in Brockman Road (now Jalan Dato' Onn), Kuala Lumpur. This building also housed the office of the first Defence Minister, the late Tun Abdul Razak bin Datuk Hussein, who served from 31 August 1957 to 22 September 1970.

The first building of the Ministry of Defence was constructed by the Federal Government at a cost of RM122,000.00 and was officially opened by Tun Haji Abdul Razak bin Datuk Hussein on 18 March 1960. The building constructed in Jalan Padang Tembak also housed the Chiefs and Officers of the Malaysian Armed Forces of the three services.

As a result of growing awareness among leaders of the importance of the armed forces, a complex consisting of six blocks of four storeys high was built in front of the Office of the Member Services Division to cater for the growing membership. The RM 2 million building was officially opened by Tunku Abdul Rahman Putra on 6 April 1967.

After the withdrawal of the British troops, the Malaysian Government took drastic measures to improve the security of the country from any threat. This task is entrusted to the Ministry of Defence as well as the task of improving efficiency in the management of military needs from time to time.

To accommodate all the agencies under one roof, the government has decided to build a new building for the Ministry of Defence. As a symbolic, the foundation stone was laid by the then Deputy Defence Minister, Dato' Abu Bakar bin Datu Abang Abang Haji Mustapha on 10 March 1982. The new building is located at Jalan Padang Tembak, Kuala Lumpur and was built with a budget of RM144 million and was completed in mid 1985. This 20 storey high building is known as "WISMA PERTAHANAN" and provides office space and meeting rooms. The area around "WISMA PERTAHANAN" known as the Defence Complex also provides facilities such as multi-storey car park building, auditorium, prayer room, Field of Defence (Parade Ground), guard stations, towers, computer room, 'helipad', cafeteria and others.

The Ministry of Defence is led by the Minister of Defence and assisted by a Deputy Minister. The organization of the Ministry of Defence consists of two main services. First, is the Public Service which is headed by the Secretary General and the Malaysian Armed Forces (MAF) is headed by Chief of the Armed Forces.

Source :

Organisation

 Minister of Defence
 Deputy Minister
 Secretary-General
 Under the Authority of Secretary-General
 Internal Audit and Investigation Division
 Malaysian Armed Forces Council Secretariat 
 Key Performance Indicator (KPI) Unit
 Legal Division
 Strategic Communication Unit
 Integrity Unit
 Deputy Secretary-General (Development)
 Development Division
 Procurement Division
 Malaysian Armed Forces Cataloguing Authority
 Deputy Secretary-General (Policy)
 Policy and Strategic Planning Division
 Defence Industry Division
 Defence Reserve Depot
 Deputy Secretary-General (Management)
 Human Resource Management Division
 Information Management Division
 Finance Division
 Account Division
 Administration Division
 Chief of Defence Forces
 Chief of Army
 Chief of Navy
 Chief of Air Force
 Joint Force Commander
 Director of General Defence Intelligence
 Chief of Staff Malaysian Armed Forces Headquarters

Federal departments
 Malaysian Armed Forces Headquarters (MAF), or Markas Angkatan Tentera Malaysia. (Official site)
 Malaysian Army, or Tentera Darat Malaysia. (Official site)
 Royal Malaysian Navy, or Tentera Laut Diraja Malaysia. (Official site)
 Royal Malaysian Air Force, or Tentera Udara Diraja Malaysia. (Official site)
 Joint Forces Command, Malaysia, or Markas Angkatan Bersama. (Official site)
 Malaysian Defence Intelligence Organisation, or Pertubuhan Perisikan Pertahanan Malaysia (PPPM).
 National Service Training Department, or Jabatan Latihan Khidmat Negara (JLKN). (Official site)
 Malaysian Armed Forces Department of Veterans Affairs, or Jabatan Hal Ehwal Veteran Angkatan Tentera Malaysia (JHEV). (Official site)
 Judge Advocate General Department, or Jabatan Ketua Hakim Peguam.
 Office of the Ministry of Defence Sabah (MINDEF Sabah), or Pejabat Kementerian Pertahanan Sabah.
 Office of the Ministry of Defence Sarawak (MINDEF Sarawak), or Pejabat Kementerian Pertahanan Sarawak.

Federal agencies
 Malaysian Institute of Defence and Security (MiDAS), or Institut Pertahanan dan Keselamatan Malaysia. (Official site)
 Science and Technology Research Institute For Defence (STRIDE), or Institut Penyelidikan Sains dan Teknologi Pertahanan. (Official site)
 Malaysian Armed Forces Cataloguing Authority (MAFCA), or Penguasa Katalog Angkatan Tentera Malaysia. (Official site)
 Defence Reserve Depot, or Depot Simpanan Pertahanan. (Official site)
 Ex-Serviceman Affairs Corporation, or Perbadanan Hal Ehwal Bekas Angkatan Tentera (PERHEBAT). (Official site)
 Armed Forces Fund Board, Lembaga Tabung Angkatan Tentera (LTAT). (Official site)

Key legislation
The Ministry of Defence is responsible for administration of several key Acts:

 Armed Forces Act 1972 [Act 77]
 Arms Act 1960 [Act 206]
 National Service Act 1952 [Act 425]
 National Service Training Act 2003 [Act 628]
 Veterans Act 2012 [Act 740]

Policy Priorities of the Government of the Day
 On 24 February 2020, MINDEF Chief of the Malaysian Armed Forces Haji Affendi Buang had unveiled the inaugural Defence White Paper which sets up strategic orientations for Malaysia's military defence in the next 10 years. The paper highlights Malaysia's geography as a maritime nation and Malaysian government’s commitment to pursuing the three pillars of the defence strategy, namely concentric deterrence, comprehensive defence and credible partnerships. The paper further primed focus on dealing with non-traditional security issues like terrorism, piracy and maritime security, cyber crime and security, and transnational crimes, as well as to apply modern technologies to defence. The 104-page document can be viewed at the following link on the MINDEF website.

See also
 Minister of Defence (Malaysia)

References

External links
 Ministry of Defence Malaysia portal
 

 
Federal ministries, departments and agencies of Malaysia
Military of Malaysia
Malaysia
Malaysia
Ministries established in 1957
1957 establishments in Malaya